Rungrath Poomchantuek (born May 17, 1992), simply known as Prince, is a Thai professional footballer who plays as a winger for Thai League 1 club Bangkok United and the Thailand national team.

International career

In March, 2015 Rungrath debut for Thailand in a friendly match against Singapore.
Rungrath won the 2015 Southeast Asian Games with Thailand U23.

International

International Goals

Under-23

Honours

Club
Chiangmai
 Regional League Northern Division (2): 2012, 2013

International
Thailand U-23
 Sea Games  Gold Medal (1); 2015
Thailand 
 ASEAN Football Championship (1): 2016

References

External links
 

1992 births
Living people
Rungrath Poomchantuek
Rungrath Poomchantuek
Association football wingers
Rungrath Poomchantuek
Rungrath Poomchantuek
Rungrath Poomchantuek
Rungrath Poomchantuek
Rungrath Poomchantuek
Rungrath Poomchantuek
Rungrath Poomchantuek
Southeast Asian Games medalists in football
Competitors at the 2015 Southeast Asian Games